Kim Hae-sung (born 12 February 1966) is a South Korean figure skater. She competed in the ladies' singles event at the 1984 Winter Olympics.

References

1966 births
Living people
South Korean female single skaters
Olympic figure skaters of South Korea
Figure skaters at the 1984 Winter Olympics
Place of birth missing (living people)